The Registro Nacional de Estrangeiros (RNE, National Registry of Foreigners), known since 2018 as Registro Nacional Migratório (RNM, National Migratory Registry) due to the New Immigration Law (Nº 13445) enacted on May 24TH 2017 by Brazilian former ex-president Michel Temer, is, next to the Registro Diplomático (RD, Diplomatic Registry), the main identification registry provided by Federative Republic Of Brazil to foreign citizens in Brazilian territory. The Cédula de Identidade de Estrangeiro (CIE, Foreigner's Identity Card), known since 2018 as Carteira de Registro Nacional Migratório (CRNM, National Migratory Registry Card) was instituted as its result by Brazilian former ex-president Getúlio Vargas on May 4TH 1938 through the Decree-Law Nº 406. The New Immigration Law lists several cases in which foreign citizens in Brazilian territory can apply for their Migratory National Registry by faculty or by obligation (most of the cases involves immigration, work or residency for undefined time). Citizens with low income, such as applicants for the Provisional Document of Migratory National Registry (refugees, asylum seekers, unaccompanied minors, human-traffickieds and human-slaveried in particularly vulnerable conditions) may apply for its fee exemption.

The RNM/CRNM is issued by Regional Superintendences of Federal Police from Federative Units. Applicants have to fill out a form and provide documentation including travel document, visa granted by a Brazilian Embassy and birth certificate (or marriage certificate, when married or divorced). Documents shall be translated by a sworn translator.

Physical Appearance 
The information contained on the current National Migratory Identity Card is given only in Portuguese.

The "Residente" card is also valid as a travel document for MERCOSUR countries.

Front Side 
The front side shows the words "República Federativa Do Brasil" (Federal Republic Of Brazil) and "Carteira De Registro Nacional Migratório". It contains the following information:
 3X4CM photo of the bearer;
 Migratory National Registry number (works as National Civil Identification);
 Classification type (provisional, borderer or resident);
 Surname of the bearer;
 Name of the bearer;
 Birth date (DD/MM/YYYY);
 Expiry date (DD/MM/YYYY);
 Filiation of the bearer;
 Nationality of the bearer;
 Expiry date (DD/MM/YYYY);
 Signature of the bearer (illiterate or stunted receive specific observation).

Rear Side 
It contains the following information:
 CPF number;
 Residency authorization deadline (DD/MM/YYYY);
 Issue date (DD/MM/YYYY);
 Card issuer (may come as CGPI/DIREX/PF or as SR/PF/UF);
 Right thumb fingerprint;
 Legal protection;
 Quick Responsive Code;
 Machine Readable Zone Code.

See also

Brazilian Identity Card
Brazilian Passport
CPF

References

External links
Brazilian Embassy (Washington D.C.)
The Brazil Business - Personal Documents
Federal Police (Official Website)  

Identity documents
Government of Brazil